A.E. Didymoteicho Football Club is a Greek football club based in Didymoteicho, Evros, Greece.

Honors

Domestic Titles and honors

 Amateur Cup: 1
 1979-80
 Evros FCA Champions: 8
 1969–70, 1973–74, 1989–90, 2001–02, 2014–15, 2015–16, 2016–17, 2019-20
 Evros FCA Cup Winners: 2
 1979–80, 2016-17

References

Football clubs in Eastern Macedonia and Thrace
Evros (regional unit)
Association football clubs established in 1933
1933 establishments in Greece
Gamma Ethniki clubs